Sharing a Robin's Life is a non-fiction book, written by Canadian writer Linda Johns, first published in July 1993 by Nimbus Publishing. In the book, the author writes in first person prose; describing when she and a robin, she had nurtured from peril, cohabited; sharing their life and home. The judges who awarded Linda Johns the "Edna Staebler Award" called the book; "a remarkable" read, saying it "challenges our preconceptions" about the "natural world around us."

Awards and honours
Sharing a Robin's Life received the 1994 "Edna Staebler Award for Creative Non-Fiction".

See also
List of Edna Staebler Award recipients

References

External links
Linda Johns, Art, books, and Contact Information, Retrieved November 21, 2012
Linda Johns, Sharing a Robin's Life, Excerpt, Retrieved November 21, 2012

Canadian non-fiction books
1993 books